Bala Mahalleh-ye Nalkiashar (also Romanized as Bālā Maḩalleh-ye Nālkīāshar) is a village in Divshal Rural District, in the Central District of Langarud County, Gilan Province, Iran. At the 2006 census, its population was 212, in 69 families.

References 

Populated places in Langarud County